is a passenger railway station located in the city of Maniwa, Okayama Prefecture, Japan, operated by West Japan Railway Company (JR West).

Lines

Station layout
The station consists of one ground-level side platform serving a single bi-directional track. There is no station building, but only a rain shelter on the platform. The station is unattended.

Adjacent stations

History
Komi Station opened on April 1, 1958. With the privatization of the Japan National Railways (JNR) on April 1, 1987, the station came under the aegis of the West Japan Railway Company.

Passenger statistics
In fiscal 2019, the station was used by an average of 69 passengers daily..

Surrounding area
Asahi River
Japan National Route 313

See also
List of railway stations in Japan

References

External links

 Komi Station Official Site

Railway stations in Okayama Prefecture
Kishin Line
Railway stations in Japan opened in 1958
Maniwa